The Roman Catholic Diocese of Santo André is a diocese located in the city of Santo André, in the Ecclesiastical province of São Paulo in Brazil.

History
 18 July 1954: Established as Diocese of Santo André from Metropolitan Archdiocese of São Paulo

Bishops
 Bishops of Santo André (Roman Rite), in reverse chronological order
 Bishop Pedro Carlos Cipolini (2015.05.27 - present)
 Bishop José Nelson Westrupp, S.C.I. (2003.10.01 – 2015.05.27)
 Bishop Décio Pereira (1997.05.21 – 2003.02.05)
 Bishop Cláudio Hummes, O.F.M. (1975.12.29 – 1996.05.29), appointed Archbishop of Fortaleza, Ceara; future Cardinal
 Bishop Jorge Marcos de Oliveira (1954.07.26 – 1975.12.29)

Coadjutor bishop
Cláudio Aury Affonso Hummes, O.F.M. (1975); future Cardinal

Auxiliary bishop
Airton José dos Santos (2001-2004), appointed Bishop of Mogi das Cruzes, São Paulo

Other priest of this diocese who became bishop
Manuel Parrado Carral, appointed Auxiliary Bishop of São Paulo in 2001

References
 GCatholic.org
 Catholic Hierarchy
 Diocese website (Portuguese) 

Roman Catholic dioceses in Brazil
Christian organizations established in 1954
Santo Andre, Roman Catholic Diocese of
Roman Catholic dioceses and prelatures established in the 20th century